The German Army is the land component of the armed forces of Germany and previously West Germany.

German Army may also refer to:

 Land Forces of the National People's Army (1956–1990), the army of East Germany
 German Army (1935–1945), the army of Nazi Germany
 Reichsheer, land component of the Reichswehr (1919–1935), the armed forces of the Weimar Republic
 Imperial German Army (1871–1919), the army of the German Empire
 Army of the Holy Roman Empire (1422–1806), the army of the Holy Roman Empire of the German Nation
 Imperial Army (Holy Roman Empire), the private army of the Holy Roman Emperor
 German Army (band), an experimental music act from California

See also
 German Legion (disambiguation), sometimes called "German Army"
 Heer (disambiguation), the German term for land army